A.Kothapalli is a village in of East Godavari district of the Indian state of Andhra Pradesh.  It is located in Thondangi Mandal of Peddapuram revenue division.

Demography 

As of the 2011 Census of India, A.Kothapalli has a total number of 2,118 houses and population of 8,604 of which include 4,291 males and 4,313 females. Literacy rate of A.Kothapalli is 55.46%, lower than state average of 67.02%.  The population of children under the age of 6 years is 1,026 which is 11.92% of total population of A.Kothapalli, and child sex ratio is approximately 966, higher than Andhra Pradesh average of 939.

References 

Villages in Thondangi mandal